Unicoi may refer to:
Unicoi Mountains, a mountain range rising along the border between Tennessee and North Carolina in the southeastern United States
Unicoi, Tennessee
Unicoi County, Tennessee
Unicoi State Park, near Helen, Georgia